It Happened in L.A. is a 2017 American comedy film written and directed by Michelle Morgan. The film stars Morgan, Jorma Taccone and Dree Hemingway. The film had its world premiere at the Sundance Film Festival on January 20, 2017. The film was released on November 3, 2017, by The Orchard.

Cast  
Michelle Morgan as Annette
Jorma Taccone as Elliot
Dree Hemingway as Baker
Kentucker Audley as Peter
Margarita Levieva as Ingrid
Adam Shapiro as Jimmy
Angela Trimbur as Simone
Robert Schwartzman as Ben
Nora Zehetner as Nora
Tate Donovan as Tom
Andre Hyland as Zee
James Ransone as Heath
Antonio Cupo as Michael
Julie Mintz as Alice
Flula Borg as Meep

Release
The film premiered at the 2017 Sundance Film Festival on January 20, 2017. In October 2017, The Orchard acquired U.S. distribution rights to the film, and set it for a November 3, 2017, release.

Critical response
On review aggregator website Rotten Tomatoes, the film has an approval rating of 69% based on 16 reviews, with a weighted average of 6/10. On Metacritic, the film holds a weighted average score of 58 out of 100, based on 11 critics, indicating "mixed or average reviews".

References

External links
 

2017 films
2017 comedy films
American comedy films
American independent films
The Orchard (company) films
2017 independent films
Films produced by Jared Stern
Films set in Los Angeles
2010s English-language films
2010s American films